Wien Stadlau is a railway station serving Donaustadt, the twenty-second district of Vienna.

Above the station is the Stadlau U-Bahn station.

Services 
 the following services stop at Wien Stadlau:

 REX: hourly service between Wien Hauptbahnhof and Bratislava.

References

External links 
 
 

Railway stations in Vienna
Austrian Federal Railways